Gavin Kelly (born 29 September 1968) is an English former footballer, born in Beverley, who played as a goalkeeper in the Football League for Hull City, Bristol Rovers and Scarborough, and in the Hong Kong First Division League for Golden. He also played non-League football for clubs including North Ferriby United, Harrogate Town, Whitby Town, Bradford Park Avenue, and Bridlington Town.

References

External links
 
 League stats at Neil Brown's site

1968 births
Living people
Sportspeople from Beverley
English footballers
Association football goalkeepers
Hull City A.F.C. players
Bristol Rovers F.C. players
Scarborough F.C. players
Sun Hei SC players
North Ferriby United A.F.C. players
Harrogate Town A.F.C. players
Whitby Town F.C. players
Bradford (Park Avenue) A.F.C. players
Bridlington Town A.F.C. players
English Football League players
Hong Kong First Division League players
Expatriate footballers in Hong Kong
English expatriate sportspeople in Hong Kong
English expatriate footballers